The Armed Forces of the Libyan Arab Jamahiriya consisted of the Libyan Army, Libyan Air Force and the Libyan Navy and other services including the People's Militia. In November 2010, before the First Civil War of 2011, the total number of Libyan personnel was estimated at 760,000 though that war wore the military's numbers away. There was no separate defence ministry; all defence activities were centralised under Gaddafi. There was a High Command of the Armed Forces (al-Qiyada al-ulya lil-quwwat al-musallaha). Arms production was limited and manufacturers were state-owned. Colonel Abu-Bakr Yunis Jabr was the last minister of defence of the Gaddafi-era military.

Origins and history 1945–69 
The roots of the 1951–2011 Libyan armed forces can be traced to the Libyan Arab Force (popularly known as the Sanusi Army) of World War II. Shortly after Italy entered the war, a number of Libyan leaders living in exile in Egypt called on their compatriots to organise themselves into military units and join the British in the war against the Axis powers. Five battalions, which were initially designed for guerrilla warfare in the Jabal al Akhdar region of Cyrenaica, were established under British command. Because the high mobility of the desert campaigns required a considerable degree of technical and mechanical expertise, the Libyan forces were used primarily as auxiliaries, guarding military installations and prisoners. One battalion, however, participated in the fighting at Tobruk.

After Britain succeeded in occupying the Libyan territories, the need for the British-trained and equipped Sanusi troops appeared to be over. The Sanusi Army was reluctant to disband, however, and the majority of its members arranged to be transferred to the local police force in Cyrenaica under the British military administration. When Libya gained its independence in 1951, veterans of the original Sanusi Army formed the nucleus of the Royal Libyan Army. British Army troops, part of Middle East Command and comprising 25th Armoured Brigade and briefly 10th Armoured Division, were still present after independence and stayed in Libya until at least 1957. Despite the Sanussi lineage of the new army, King Idris I quickly came to distrust them. The Free Officers' coup of 1952 in Egypt led many Libyan officers to be disenchanted with Idris and become great followers of Gamal Abdel Nasser. This situation reached the stage that the British Army officers retained by Idris to train and advise the new armed forces deemed the force entirely untrustworthy. They increasingly saw their role as to watch the army rather than to raise its effectiveness.

Meanwhile, Idris formed a navy in 1962 and an air force in 1963. He attempted to counter his growing doubts about the loyalty of the army by stripping it of potential. He placed loyal but often unqualified Cyrenaicans in all senior command positions, limited the armed forces to 6,500 men, kept the army lightly armed, and built up two rival paramilitary units, the National Security Force and the Cyrenaican Defence Force which was recruited from Cyrenaican Bedouin loyal to the Sanussi. Together the two forces had a total of 14,000 men armed with helicopters, armoured cars, anti-tank weapons, and artillery.

These measures did not prevent, however, a group of army officers led by then Captain Muammar Gaddafi (a signals officer) seizing power on 1 September 1969. Pollack says that the defeat of the Arabs during the Six-Day War of July 1967 was an important factor in the coup, as the officers believed that Libya should have dispatched forces to aid Egypt and the other Arab states. Idris had also tried to reform the military, but only half-heartedly, further frustrating young Libyan officers. Immediately after the coup, Gaddafi began to dismiss, arrest, or execute every officer above the rank of colonel in the armed forces, as well as some other lower-ranking officers closely linked to the monarchy. Then he began to reorganise the armed forces in line with his foreign policy plans. Expansion of the army and amalgamation of the CDF and NSF into the army was the first priority, and by 1970 the force numbered nearly 20,000. Attention was also focused on the Air Force, with the pre-coup strength of 400 personnel and ten Northrop F-5 'Freedom Fighter' jet fighters planned to be supplemented with large-scale purchases of Mirage III fighters from France.

Forces under Gaddafi

Army 
In 2009, the Libyan Army consisted of 25,000 volunteers with an additional 25,000 conscripts (total 50,000). At that time, the army was organised into 11 Border Defence and 4 Security Zones, one regime security brigade, 10 Tank Battalions, 10 Mechanized Infantry Battalions, 18 Infantry Battalions, 6 Commando Battalions, 22 Artillery Battalions, 4 SSM Brigade and 7 Air Defence Artillery Battalions. Khamis Gaddafi's 32nd Brigade was one of the main regime protection forces. The 'Khamis Brigade' was considered by US diplomats in 2009 as the most capable of defending the regime. In addition, the Revolutionary Guard Corps also served as a brigade-sized protection force for Gaddafi. In 2009, it emerged that a British Special Air Service team were training Libyan special forces. Under Gaddafi, conscription was listed as 18 months.

In addition, seven military regions had been listed in various sources as part of the Gaddafi-era military. These regions appear to have included the Western Military Region (Tripoli), the Middle Military Region (Sirte), the Eastern Military Region (Tobruk), the Mountain Military Region (Gharyan), and regions headquartered at Kufra and Benghazi. The final military region appears to have been the Southern Military Region headquartered at Sabha in the southeast.

Though the Libyan army had a large amount of fighting equipment at its disposal, the vast majority was bought from the Soviet Union in the 1970s and 1980s and eventually became largely obsolete. A high percentage remained in storage and a large amount of equipment was also sold to various African countries. No major purchases of equipment had been made in recent years largely due to the decline of the economy and military sanctions experienced throughout the 1990s. This and various other internal factors had seriously decayed the strength of the whole of the Libyan Armed Forces over the years and it lagged behind its major neighbours in terms of its military capabilities and real war fighting capability.

Libya dispatched a contingent to the Arab Deterrent Force in Lebanon in 1976 as the Lebanese Civil War escalated. In the spring of 1979, after the Arab League had extended the mandate of the Arab Deterrent Force, the Sudanese, the Saudis and the UAE troops departed Lebanon, the Libyan troops were essentially abandoned and had to find their own way home, if at all.

From the late 1970s to around 1987, the armed forces were involved in the Chadian–Libyan conflict with four major incursions into Chad. The Libyan Army suffered great losses in these conflicts, especially that of the Toyota War of 1987, largely due to poor tactics and Western aid to Chad. All of these incursions were eventually repulsed and Libya no longer occupies the Aouzou Strip or any other part of Chad.

The Libyan Army ceased functioning following the rebel victory in the First Libyan Civil War.

Army equipment 
The Libyan ground forces had a large amount of mostly Soviet equipment in service. These numbers do not take into account equipment destroyed or captured during the 2011 Libyan civil war.

The IISS estimated tank numbers in 2009 as 2,025:
 T-55 – 1000+ T-54/T-55
 T-62 – 600; 462 in store;
 T-72 – 150; 115 in store.

Russian official sources reported in 2010 that T-72s would be modernised with help from Russia. 750 BTR-50 and BTR-60s were also reported by the IISS.

The IISS estimated there were 500 BRDM-2 and 700 EE-9 Cascavel reconnaissance vehicles, 1,000 BMP-1s, plus BMDs. Other reported wheeled vehicles in service include 1000 EE-11 Urutu and Czechoslovak OT-64 SKOT.

The IISS estimated artillery in service in 2009 as totaling 2,421 pieces.

444 SP artillery pieces were reported:
 122 mm – 130 2S1 Carnation;
 152 mm – 140: 60 2S3 Akatsiya; 80 M-77 Dana;
 155 mm – 174: 14 M-109; 160 VCA 155 Palmaria.

647+ towed artillery pieces were reported:
 105 mm – 42+ M-101
 122 mm – 250: 190 D-30; 60 D-74;
 130 mm – 330 M-46;
 152 mm – 25 ML-20.
 155 mm – ?  M114 155 mm howitzer

830 multiple rocket launchers were reported:
 107 mm Type 63 multiple rocket launcher – an estimated 300;
 122 mm – 530: ε200 BM-11; ε230 BM-21 Grad; ε100 RM-70 Dana (RM-70 multiple rocket launcher?).

The IISS also estimated that Libya had 500 mortars:
 82 mm – 428;
 120 mm – ε48 120-PM-43 mortar;
 160 mm – ε24 160mm Mortar M1943.

Surface-to-surface missiles reported in service included FROG-7 and SCUD-B (416 missiles).

Anti-tank missiles reported in service included 400 French/German MILAN, and 620+ AT-3, AT-4, and AT-5, all of Soviet manufacture.

In 2009 the IISS estimated that Libya had Crotale, SA-7 Grail, and SA-9/SA-13 surface-to-air missiles, as well as AA guns in Army service. A separate Air Defence Command had SA-2 Guideline, SA-3 Goa, SA-5 Gammon, and SA-8b Gecko missiles, plus guns.

Reported anti-aircraft artillery included Soviet 57 mm 57 mm S-60, 23 mm self-propelled ZSU-23-4 and ZU-23-2, Czech M53/59 Praga, and Swedish Bofors 40 mm guns.

Small arms reported in service included TT pistol, Browning Hi-Power, Beretta M12, FN P90, FN FAL, SKS, AK-47, AKM and AK-103 assault rifles, the FN F2000, Soviet RPD machine gun, RPK machine gun, PK machine guns, DShK heavy machine gun, KPV heavy machine guns, SG-43 Goryunov, and a number of RPG-type and anti-aircraft missile systems: RPG-2, RPG-7, 9K32 Strela-2.

Arms and ammunition deliveries 
Even in the five years between 2005 and 2009, large quantities of arms and ammunition were delivered to Libya. It is not always clear which armed service or police organisation received the weaponry.
Bulgaria delivered €1,850,594 worth of material in the category of small arms in 2006. In 2009, the country licensed the delivery of €3.73 million of material in the category of ammunition. It is not clear whether all 3.73 million of material was actually delivered.
Serbia exported $1,920,185 of equipment including assault rifles for 'civilian and military end-users' to Libya in 2009. In 2008 Serbia exported $1,613,280 of equipment including automatic rifles and sub-machine guns. There also were large deliveries to brokers acting as intermediaries for several countries including Libya in 2005, 2006 and 2007.
Malta delivered €7,936,000 of what were described as 'non-military items' to Libya in 2009. There was a mistake in original reports which gave the value as €79 million. Despite being marked as 'non-military items,' the shipment comprised 1,800 Benelli 12 gauge shotguns, 7,500 semi-automatic Beretta Px4 Storm pistols, and 1,900 cal 9xI9mm Beretta Cx4 Storm semi-automatic carbines. They were destined for the General People's Committee for Public Security, effectively Libya's Ministry of the Interior.

Air & Air Defence Forces 

The Libyan Air Force was created after the US and UK pressured then-ruling King Idris to modernise his armed forces so that they could better stand off against revolutionary regimes in the Middle East. The LAF was created in 1963. The Libyan Air Force had an estimated personnel strength of 22,000 in 2005. There were 13 military airbases in Libya.

After US forces had left Libya in 1970, Wheelus Air Base, a previous US facility about seven miles from Tripoli, became a Libyan Air Force installation and was renamed Okba Ben Nafi Air Base. The base housed the LPAF's headquarters and a large share of its major training facilities.

All combat aircraft of the Libyan Air Force that were not in the rebel forces' hands were destroyed by NATO bombings during the civil war, effectively leading to the destruction of the Libyan Air Force.

Aircraft 
MiG-21 – 32
MiG-23 – 26
MiG-25 – 35
Su-22 – 18
Su-24 – 22
G-2 Galeb – 16;(G2A-E version)
Mirage 5 – 8
Mirage F1 – 12
Tupolev Tu-22 – 7
Surface-to-Air Missiles include:
Almaz S-75 Volga / SA-2 Guideline – 6 Brigades with 18 launchers each;
Almaz S-125 Pechora / SA-3 Goa – 9 Brigades with 12 launchers each;
Almaz S-200VE Vega / SA-5 Gammon long range missile systems – 8 battalions of 6 launchers each at 4 sites and an estimated 380 missiles;
Crotale – 9 acquisition and 27 firing units
9K33 Osa/ SA-8 Gecko – 50
9K38 Igla – 380;
9K34 Strela-3 – 278;
ZSU-23-4Shilka – 200;
ZSU-57-2 – 75;
2K12 Kub – 50;

Navy 

The Libyan Navy is the maritime force of Libya, established in November 1962. It is a fairly typical small navy with a few missile frigates, corvettes and patrol boats to defend the coastline, but with a very limited self-defence capability. The Navy has always been the smallest of Libya's services and has always been dependent on foreign sources for equipment, spare parts, and training. The total personnel of the Libyan Navy is about 8,000.

Its first warship was delivered in 1966. Initially the effective force was limited to smaller vessels, but this changed after the rise of Colonel Muammar Gaddafi in 1969. From this time, Libya started to buy armaments from Europe and the Soviet Union. The Customs and Harbour police were amalgamated with the Navy in 1970, extending the Navy's mission to include anti-smuggling and customs duties. Originally Libya received six submarines from the Soviet union in 1982, but it is very unlikely that the submarines are still operational.

Much of the Libyan Navy was rendered inoperable by NATO bombing in 2011, and the exact number of surviving vessels is unknown.

Paramilitary forces

Revolutionary Guard Corps 
The Revolutionary Guard Corps (Liwa Haris al-Jamahiriya) or Jamahiriya Guard was a Libyan paramilitary key protection force of the government of Muammar Gaddafi, until his death in October 2011. Composed of 3,000 men hand-picked from Gaddafi's tribal group in the Sirte region, the Guard was well armed, being provided with T-54 and T-62 tanks, APCs, MRLs, SA-8 and ZSU-23-4 SAMs taken from the army inventory. As of 2005, its commander was Hasan al-Kabir al-Gaddafi, a cousin of the former Libyan leader.

The Revolutionary Guard developed from the Revolutionary Committees, even if the latter had at first been introduced only into workplaces and communities, and not extended to the military. After the early 1980s, however, the Revolutionary Guard, as a paramilitary wing of the Revolutionary Committees, became entrenched within the armed forces. They served as a parallel channel of control, a means of ideological indoctrination in the barracks, and an apparatus for monitoring suspicious behavior. The Revolutionary Guards reportedly held the keys to ammunition stockpiles at the main military bases, doling it out in small quantities as needed by the regular forces. Their influence increased after a coup attempt in May 1985, that was blocked mainly thanks to the action of the Revolutionary Guard that engaged regular army units in a series of street battles.

Pan-African Legion 
In about 1980, Gaddafi introduced the Islamic Pan-African Legion, a body recruited primarily among dissidents from Sudan, Egypt, Tunisia, Mali, and Chad. West African states with Muslim populations have also been the source of some personnel. Believed to consist of about 7,000 individuals, the force has received training from experienced Palestinian and Syrian instructors. Some of those recruited to the legion were said to have been forcibly impressed from among nationals of neighboring countries who migrated to Libya in search of work.

According to the Military Balance published by the International Institute for Strategic Studies, the force was organized into one armored, one infantry, and one paratroop/commando brigade. It has been supplied with T-54 and T-55 tanks, armored personnel carriers, and EE-9 armored cars. The Islamic Pan-African Legion was reported to have been committed during the fighting in Chad in 1980 and was praised by Gaddafi for its success there. However, it was believed that many of the troops who fled the Chadian attacks of March 1987 were members of the Legion.

Islamic Arab Legion 
In an effort to realise Gaddafi's vision of a united Arab military force, plans for the creation of an Islamic Arab Legion were being announced from time to time. The goal, according to the Libyan press, would be to assemble an army of one million men and women fighters to prepare for the great Arab battle – "the battle of liberating Palestine, of toppling the reactionary regimes, of annihilating the borders, gates, and barriers between the countries of the Arab homeland, and of creating the single Arab Jamahiriya from the ocean to the gulf". In March 1985, it was announced that the National Command of the Revolutionary Forces Command in the Arab Nation had been formed with Gaddafi at its head. A number of smaller radical Arab groups from Lebanon, Tunisia, Sudan, Iraq, the Persian Gulf states, and Jordan were represented at the inaugural meeting. Syrian Ba'ath Party and radical Palestinian factions were also present. Each of these movements was expected to earmark 10 per cent of its forces for service under the new command. As of April 1987, there was no information confirming the existence of such a militia.

People's Militia 
In 1987 the mission of the 45,000 People's Militia was territorial defence, and it was to function under the leadership of local military commanders. Gaddafi contended that it was the People's Militia that met the Egyptian incursions during the border clash of 1977, although the Egyptians insisted that their successful raids had been contested by regular army units. The militia forces are not known to have faced any other test that would permit an appraisal of their performance in home defence or as auxiliaries to the regular army. There was some evidence that local commanders had not responded energetically to their responsibility for training and supervising militia units. Militia units were reportedly generously equipped with arms, transport, and uniforms. In November 1985, it was announced that the first contingent of "armed people" trained as paratroopers had made a demonstration drop. Thousands of People's Militiamen were part of the Libyan expeditionary force that was airlifted to Uganda in 1979. The Libyan troops were supposed to help defend the collapsing regime of Ugandan dictator Idi Amin, an ally of Gaddafi, amid the Uganda–Tanzania War. Like the other Libyan units sent to Uganda, the People's Militia was ill-prepared (some militiamen were not even informed that they were supposed to fight, and had believed theirs to be a pure training mission) and consequently suffered heavy losses during the Battle of Lukaya and Battle of Entebbe. Amin's government was overthrown, and the surviving Libyans were forced to flee Uganda.

It is not clear whether the force still existed by the time of the 2011 civil war.

Uniforms, ranks, and insignia as of 1987 
When the army and navy were formed, the uniforms adopted by each service reflected British military and naval tradition. Modifications have occurred over the intervening years, however, and in early 1987 Libyan uniforms were similar to those worn by military personnel of a number of Middle-Eastern Arab countries. The standard field uniform for Libyan paratroopers (Army commandos) was a two-piece camouflage uniform made of water repellent cotton. The shirt was similar in design to the United States Army fatigue shirt. The shirt and trousers were camouflaged in blue-green, light green, and dark brown. The standard headgear for paratroopers was a sky-blue beret. The uniforms of the air force, however, continued to resemble in both style and colour the uniforms of the United States Air Force, which served as a model when the Libyan Air Force was established.

Originally the rank structure of all three services was similar to that of the British Armed Forces, but some modifications were introduced in light of the small size of the Libyan military establishment. In early 1979, the system prescribed by law still included nine officer grades and five enlisted ranks; there were no warrant officer equivalents. Although three general officer grades continued to be authorised, they have not been used since the 1969 coup. Promoted to the grade of colonel (aqid) after assuming power, Gaddafi maintained a ceiling on the grade level of his officer corps in keeping with his desire to avoid the ostentatious public image that the generals of the monarchy had conveyed. In January 1976, the Arab Socialist Union's National Congress attempted to promote Gaddafi to major general. The Libyan leader stated that he would accept the honour as an expression of gratitude from his compatriots but would retain the title of colonel because it had become an accepted and traditional part of his name.

After the 2011 Libyan civil war

See also 
 Green Resistance
 National Liberation Army
 Free Libyan Air Force
 Brigade 93

References

Further reading 
 Global Security Article on Libya
 Derek Lutterbeck, 'Arming Libya: Transfers of Conventional Weapons Past and Present,' Contemporary Security Policy, 30:3 (December 2009), pp 505–528, online published 30 November 2009
 Kenneth M. Pollack, Arabs at War: Military Effectiveness 1948–91, University of Nebraska Press, Lincoln and London, 2002, 
 Mansour O. El-Kikhia's Libya's Qaddafi: The Politics of Contradiction, pub 1997, 
 International Crisis Group, 'Holding Libya Together: Security Challenges after Qadhafi,' Africa/Middle East Report No. 115, 14 December 2011

External links 
Further reading on tribal/regime split of army

1969 establishments in Libya
2011 disestablishments in Libya
Military of Libya
Libya
Libya
Libya
Libya
First Libyan Civil War